Marchesa is a hereditary title of nobility.

Marchesa may also refer to:

Marchesa (brand), brand specializing in high end womenswear
Marchesa Casati (painting), portrait painting of Luisa Casati by Augustus John

See also

Marchesana, a grape variety
Marquesa (disambiguation)